Bahnhofstrasse is Zürich's main downtown street and one of the world's most expensive and exclusive shopping avenues. In 2011, a study named the Bahnhofstrasse the most expensive street for retail property in Europe, and the third most expensive worldwide. In 2016, the street ranked ninth.

 It came into existence when the city fortifications were demolished in 1864 and the ditch in front of the walls was filled in. Until that time, the name of the location had been Fröschengraben ("Ditch Of The Frogs"), which then was changed to Bahnhofstrasse ("Railway Station Street").

Bahnhofstrasse starts at Bahnhofplatz ("Station Square") in front of the Zürich Hauptbahnhof, passing Rennweg, Augustinergasse and Paradeplatz before it ends after 1.4 km at Bürkliplatz on Lake Zürich (National Bank), (Hotel Baur au Lac).

The street is largely pedestrianised, but is also an important link in the Zürich tram network. North of Paradeplatz the street carries routes 6, 7, 11 and 13, whilst to the south it carries 2, 8, 9 and 11. Stops are served at Hauptbahnhof, Rennweg, Paradeplatz, Börsenstrasse and Bürkliplatz.

Some of the many shops include:
 Ambassadour House
 Apple Store
 Blancpain
 Breguet
 Burberry
 Bvlgari
 Cartier
 Chanel
 Dior
 Ermenegildo Zegna
 
 Giorgio Armani
 Globus
 Gucci
 Hackett London
 Hermès
 H&M
 Jelmoli
 Louis Vuitton
 Mont Blanc
 Prada
 Salvatore Ferragamo
 Tiffany and Co.
 Tissot
 Tommy Hilfiger
 Trois Pommes
 Vacheron Constantin
 Victorinox
 Zara

Paradeplatz, one of the most famous squares in Switzerland, is situated towards the end of the Bahnhofstrasse closest to Lake Zürich. The two biggest Swiss banks, UBS and the Credit Suisse Group, have their headquarters there. Paradeplatz is also known for its chocolate shop and cafe, Confiserie Sprüngli.

References

External links

 Official website
 Photographs of the Bahnhofstrasse
 Guide with shops on Bahnhofstrasse
 Location development in Zurich and Bahnhofstrasse

Streets in Zürich
Shopping districts and streets in Switzerland
Odonyms referring to a building